Ravikanth is an Indian actor who has appeared in Tamil language films.

Career
Ravi began his professional career as a sound engineer and when the company closed down, he joined a drama troupe. At the troupe, he became acquainted with Charuhasan who introduced him to Ananthu, an associate of director K. Balachander. Soon after, Ravi was given the stage name of Ravikanth and made his acting debut in Balachander's Manathil Uruthi Vendum (1987). During the period, he also shot for a supporting role in Apoorva Sagodharargal (1989) but his portions were cut owing to the film's length. Ravikanth later moved on to work on television serials, regularly collaborating on K. Balachander's productions including Sahana and Solathan Ninaikiraen.

In the 2000s, Ravikanth has regularly worked on films directed by Venkat Prabhu starting from Saroja (2008). In Venkat Prabhu's comedy drama Goa, Ravikanth portrayed eleven different characters and labelled the film as his "big break". He has since appeared in films such as Mankatha and Biriyani (2013) with the director. Some of his films in the 2000s, such as the Premgi-starrer 2010 Bhagyaraj and the Silambarasan-starrer Kettavan were dropped mid-production.

Outside of his film career, Ravikanth owns Reflomats, a business specialising in the production of signs.

Personal life
Ravikanth married actress Ambika in 2000, after divorcing his first wife. He then later got divorced Ambika in 2002.

Filmography

Television

References

External links

Indian male film actors
Tamil male actors
Living people
Indian male television actors
Male actors from Tamil Nadu
20th-century Indian male actors
21st-century Indian male actors
1962 births